Katie Morgan is an American pornographic actress, film actress, former radio talk-show host, podcast host and feature dancer.

Career
Her first sex scene was in Ed Powers' Dirty Debutantes 197 in 2001. In the HBO documentary film Katie Morgan: A Porn Star Revealed (2005),  she describes having chosen the surname "Morgan" in reference to the alcoholic beverage Captain Morgan's Rum, and the first name "Katie" in reference to the real first name of the Scarlett O'Hara character in Gone with the Wind.

She unofficially retired from adult films in 2008, and it was made official when she married a year later. In September 2015, she ended seven years of retirement by announcing her signing with Nexxxt Level Talent and began shooting productions in Los Angeles and Miami.

Appearances
She has been featured on HBO's A Real Sex Xtra: Pornucopia – Going Down in the Valley, Katie Morgan on Sex Toys, Katie Morgan: Porn 101, and Katie Morgan's Sex Tips: Questions, Anyone?, some of which, she would host completely naked except for a pair of high heels.

Morgan has been interviewed on several FM band and Sirius Satellite Radio shows, including King Dude, The Mike Church Show and on the Opie & Anthony Show on XM Satellite Radio. For several years, she co-hosted The Wanker Show on adult internet radio station KSEXradio.com.

In 2008, Morgan made a guest appearance on HBO's Entourage playing herself, and her first mainstream feature film appearance in Kevin Smith's comedy, Zack and Miri Make a Porno. From 2011 to 2013, she hosted Having Sex, With Katie Morgan on S.I.R! at Smodcast.com, and was a panelist on That Sex Show on the Logo cable television network in 2013. In 2016, she appeared in Vixens from Venus.

Awards

 2005 XRCO Award - Unsung Siren
 2009 AVN Award - Crossover Star Of The Year
 2009 Mr. Skin Anatomy Award - Best Porn Star Gone Hollywood (Zack and Miri Make a Porno)
 2013 AVN Hall of Fame
 2021 XRCO Hall of Fame

Personal life
Morgan was raised in Los Angeles, California in an extremely religious family. She married Jim Jackman, whom she met on the set of Zack and Miri Make a Porno.

References

External links

 
 
 

Year of birth missing (living people)
Actresses from Los Angeles
American women podcasters
American podcasters
American people convicted of drug offenses
American pornographic film actresses
Living people
Pornographic film actors from California
21st-century American women